Brian Arthur Thrush  (born 23 July 1928) is a British physical chemist. He is an Emeritus Professor of Physcial Chemistry at the University of Cambridge and a Life Fellow of Emmanuel College.

Research 
Thrush studied the atom and free radical reactions in the gas phase of spectroscopic methods. He made the first comprehensive examination of the absorption spectra of free radicals in homogeneous explosions using flash photolysis. He discovered the absorption spectra of several free radicals (for example, the azide, cyclopentadienyl and tropyl radicals), and he determined the ionisation potential of the tropyl radical.

He developed a new method of studying hydrogen atom reactions, and determined the rate constants of a series of nitrogen, hydrogen and oxygen atom reactions important in combustion and in the upper atmosphere. He was interested in chemiluminescence and produced a series of papers on the formation of electronically excited molecules in transfer or recombination reactions.

Thrush also developed a photochemical method for studying unimolecular reactions of molecules with known energies. He also studied the rotational spectra of free radicals using the Zeeman effect to bring them into resonance with a far infrared laser.

Awards and honours 
Thrush won the Tilden Prize of the Royal Society of Chemistry in 1965. He was elected a Fellow of the Royal Society (FRS) in 1976.

References 

Living people
Fellows of the Royal Society
1928 births
British physical chemists
Fellows of Emmanuel College, Cambridge